Clément Chartier  (born 1946) is a Métis Canadian leader. Chartier served as President of the World Council of Indigenous Peoples between 1984–87 and vice-president between 1993 and 1997.

Born in Île-à-la-Crosse, Saskatchewan, Chartier grew up in Buffalo Narrows, Saskatchewan. He officially became a lawyer in 1980.

Chartier was president of Canada's Métis National Council from 24 October 2003 to 30 September 2021. He was president of Métis Nation—Saskatchewan 1998–2003, and turned over that office to interim president Lorna Docken when he became president of the Metis National Council. Chartier announced in November 2019 that Manitoba Metis Federation president David Chartrand would lead the MNC for national affairs until the council's next election and serve as the national spokesperson.

In 2021 Chartier stood for election to the presidency of the MN-S again, but was unsuccessful in his run.

Education
 1967: graduated from Athol Murray College of Notre Dame, Wilcox, Saskatchewan
 1978: Bachelor of Laws, University of Saskatchewan, Saskatoon, Saskatchewan

Awards and recognition
 February 2004: Queen's Counsel from Saskatchewan provincial government

References

External links
 Métis National Council: Clément Chartier profile

1946 births
Living people
Métis politicians
University of Saskatchewan alumni
Indigenous leaders in Saskatchewan
Canadian Métis people
Athol Murray College of Notre Dame alumni
Canadian King's Counsel
University of Saskatchewan College of Law alumni